Kerry Williams (born 7 September 1977 in Edmondson, Canada), is a Canadian former women's International motorcycle trials rider. Williams is a three time US NATC Trials National Champion, winning the title in 2002, 2006 and 2007.

Biography

Williams competed in both Canada and the United States throughout her career. In 2000 she was runner-up to her sister Christy Williams in the American NATC Women's Trials Championship, winning the final two rounds. 2000 was also the first year that a women's championship was added to the annual Trial des Nations event, this year held in Spain. Kerry and Christy competed as the Canadian team finishing a creditable 5th. Williams also picked up a 10th place finish in the FIM Women's Trials Championship in Spain.

2001 saw a repeat performance with another second place finish in the NATC Women's Championship behind her sister, also second place in the Canadian Women's Championship again behind Christy. They then teamed up to take on the world and scored another 5th place in the Women's TDN in France.

Williams dominated the 2002 NATC championship, winning all ten rounds and scoring her first US National title. Back home she was runner-up to Christy in the Canadian Championship, and the pair headed to Portugal to contest the Trial des Nations, returning with a 6th place team performance and a 10th place finish in the World Championship round for Kerry.

The 2003 NATC season started brightly with a win at the California opening round, but a string of runner-up finishes meant that she was pipped to the title by Christy at the end of the season. She also finished in 13th place in the San Marino world round.

Following a familiar pattern, Williams followed her sister home for a Canadian one-two finish in the 2004 NATC championship. The Canadian team of Kerry, Christy and Heather Wall finished 6th in Spain for the Trial Des Nations. On the world scene Kerry took a 19th and an 11th place in Spain, finishing 16th in the FIM Trial World Championship.
 
Williams slipped back to 3rd spot in the 2005 NATC series after a season long battle with Christy and Louise Forsley, the highlight of the season was winning the final two rounds in Rhode Island. The Canadian TDN team was unchanged from the previous year and finished in 7th place in Italy.

Williams took control of the 2006 NATC championship from the opening round, winning all five rounds that she contended, and taking the title ahead of Caroline Altman and Sarah Duke.

2007 was another stellar performance for Williams in the NATC championship, again winning all six rounds she entered. Runner-up was Colorado rider Sarah Duke.

In 2009 Williams finished 4th in the NATC series.

Williams final year in the NATC championship was 2010. She finished the season in 3rd behind Christy and Caroline Allen.

National Trials Championship Career

International Trials Championship Career

Honors
 US National NATC Women's Trials Champion 2002, 2006, 2007

Related Reading
NATC Trials Championship
FIM Trial European Championship
FIM Trial World Championship

References 

1977 births
Living people
Canadian motorcycle racers
Motorcycle trials riders